Jay Morrish (c. 1936 – March 2, 2015) was an American golf course designer. He graduated from Colorado State University with a degree in Landscape and Nursery Management. In 1964, he taught Horticulture at that university while pursuing graduate degrees.

Morrish served a four-year apprenticeship with Robert Trent Jones, and subsequently two years with George Fazio.

From 1972–1982, he worked for Jack Nicklaus as a member of his golf course design support staff working on the following golf courses:
 Annandale Golf Club, Madison, Mississippi, 1981
 Bear Creek Golf Club, Murrieta, California, 1982
 Bear's Paw Country Club, Naples, Florida, 1980
 Castle Pines, Colorado
 Colorado National, Colorado
 Country Club at Muirfield Village, Dublin, Ohio, 1982
 Country Club of St. Albans, St. Albans, Missouri, 1981
 Country Club of the Rockies, Edwards, Colorado,	1984
 Desert Highlands Golf Club, Scottsdale, Arizona, 1984
 Glen Abbey Golf Club, Oakville, Ontario, Canada, 1976
 Lochinvar Golf Club, Houston, Texas, 1980
 Marbella Country Club, San Juan Capistrano, California, 1989
 Muirfield Village Golf Club, Dublin, Ohio
 New St. Andrews Golf Club, Japan, 1976
 Ravenna, Littleton, Colorado
 Sailfish Point Country Club, Stuart, Florida, 1981
 Shoal Greek Golf Club, Birmingham, Alabama, 1977
 Walden Lake Golf & Country Club, Plant City, Florida, 1978

In 1983, Morrish left the Nicklaus organization and formed a partnership with PGA Tour professional Tom Weiskopf.  The Morrish/Weiskopf partnership resulted in the design or updating of more than twenty golf courses including:
Double Eagle Club
Northwood Club
Troon North Golf Club
Scottsdale TPC
Forest Highlands
Blackstone Country Club

Son Carter Morrish joined in 1998 to form Jay Morrish and Associates in 1988 where they designed the 2 courses at Boulders Resort & Spa.  Pine Canyon Club Golf Course was the last golf course Morrish designed.

Morrish was a member of the American Society of Golf Course Architects, and was president of that body from 2002–2004.  In 2007, Morrish was inducted into the Colorado Golf Hall of Fame in a ceremony at Columbine Country Club.  He died at the age of 78 on March 2, 2015.

References

External links 
 Traditional Classic Golf Course Design by Morrish & Assoc. 
 Jay Morrish Courses Built from World Golf 
 Jay Morrish profile
 American Society of Golf Course Architects profile

Golf course architects
1930s births
2015 deaths